Big Wave is the soundtrack album for the motion picture of the same name, produced and recorded by Japanese singer-songwriter Tatsuro Yamashita. It was released in June 1984 and peaked at No.2 on the Oricon Albums Chart for a 19-week stay. The album was heavily influenced by the songwriting and production of Brian Wilson. Its first half consists of original songs, with English lyrics by Alan O'Day, while the second is mostly cover versions of Beach Boys songs.

Background
The film, directed by Walter McConnelly and released May 25, 1984, features big wave surfers Mark Richards, Michael Ho, Tommy Carroll, Sam George, Rabbit Bartholomew, Peter Townend, Cheyne Horan, Willie Morris, Martin Potter, and others riding huge waves on the North Shore of Oahu and Maui.  In addition, other summer sports such as windsurfing with Richard White and Matt Schweitzer, water skiing, and roller skating are featured. The film Big Wave was released on DVD by Pony Canyon (PCBH-50151) on May 27, 2005.

The A-side of Big Wave is composed of the songs Tatsuro Yamashita wrote, and the rest of the album consists mostly of cover versions of compositions of the Beach Boys' frontman Brian Wilson. The song "The Theme from Big Wave" was first aired on the NHK-FM radio program hosted by Yamashita in January 1983. It features his former bandmate Taeko Onuki on lead vocals, and its lyrics were written in Japanese by her. As the title indicated, he remade the song as the theme for the film. English-language lyrics were written by Alan O'Day, who worked with him for the first time on Mariya Takeuchi's Miss.M album released in 1980. O'Day also contributed the lyrics for all the Yamashita-penned songs which appeared on the Big Wave, including "Your Eyes" which had earlier appeared on Yamashita's 1982 album For You. "Jody" is a newly recorded version of the lead-off track for his album Melodies released in 1983, which was originally sung in Japanese lyrics. "I Love You" was featured on Suntory's TV advertising aired from 1983 for about three years. Except instrumental version of "I Love You" and "Girls on the Beach", most songs included on the B-Side of the soundtrack were previously issued on his albums or flip side for singles, although some of them remixed or additionally recorded.

Big Wave peaked at #2 on the Japanese Oricon and sold over 450,000 copies while it was staying on the chart, becoming one of the commercially successful soundtrack albums in Japan at the time.

Track listing
All tracks written by Tatsuro Yamashita and Alan O'Day, except where noted.

30th anniversary editions
On July 23, 2014, the 30th Anniversary Edition of Big Wave was released by Warner Music Japan on CD (digital) (ASIN: B00JYR5INO  EAN: 4943674181339).  Seven additional tracks were added:
"Breakdance" [previously unreleased] 
"I Love You" [previously unreleased acapella 120 sec. version] 
"Only With You" [guitar instrumental] 
"This Could Be The Night" [previously unreleased alternate mix] 
"Please Let Me Wonder" [previously unreleased karaoke] 
"Only With You" [previously unreleased karaoke] 
"I Love You" [previously unreleased acapella 30 sec. version]

On August 20, 2014, the 30th Anniversary Limited Edition of Big Wave was released by Warner Music Japan on 180g LP (analog) (ASIN: B00L6RRX2E  EAN： 4943674181353).  The two disc set has twelve tracks:

Side one
"The Theme From Big Wave"
"Jody"
"Only With You" 

Side two
"Magic Ways"
"Your Eyes"
"I Love You... (Part II)"

Side three
"Girls On The Beach"
"Please Let Me Wonder"
"Darlin'"

Side four
"Guess I'm Dumb"
"This Could Be The Night"
"I Love You... (Part I)"

Chart positions

Weekly charts

Year-end charts

References

Tatsuro Yamashita albums
1984 soundtrack albums
Film soundtracks
Big wave surfing